Karen McCoy is an American visual artist whose work focuses on sculpture, environmental art, walking art, and land art. She resides in Kansas City, Missouri, where she is a professor emeritus in sculpture and social practice at the Kansas City Art Institute. She also taught sculpture and design at Williams College (1987-1994), Colby College (1987), and the University of Minnesota-Morris (1982-1985).

Work
McCoy's sculptural works are created out of a combination of artistic practice and environmental activism, with focus on the ecological, geographical, cultural, and societal histories of the site at which the work is created. Works such as Giardino Galleggiante per Venezia (Floating Garden for Venice, expected 2021), Tree in Tree (2004, with Matt Dehaemers and members of the Osage Nation, Forest Park, St. Louis, MO), Island Gridded for Growth (2000, Jackson, WY), and Considering Mother's Mantle (1992, Syracuse, NY) are created by way of subtle physical alterations to the environment (i.e. - the planting of vegetation). In other projects, such as Seemingly Unconnected Events (2011, Wentworth-Coolidge Mansion State Historic Site, Portsmouth, NH, The Land Institute, Salina, KS and others) and the land art project The Taiwan Tangle: Space for Contemplating Carrying Capacity (2009, Guandu International Sculpture Festival, Guandu Nature Park, Taipei, Taiwan), McCoy uses reclaimed materials to create large-scale sculptures that address issues of global climate change, sustainability, and resource depletion.

She has created drawings made as a result of walking since 1987 (Mnemotopias or memory of place drawings) and several sculpture projects that involve listening and walking, most recently the Sound and Sight Walk in Central Park, on invitation of the Walk Exchange/NY and in Kansas City for the Open Spaces exhibition, 2017. She is a member of the Walking Artists Network and her open source cut-and-fold paper Listening Trumpet may be found in the book Ways to Wander published by their research group, Footwork.

Karen McCoy frequently collaborates with composer Robert Carl, an ongoing body of work that includes her ear horns and listening post sculptures. Made from materials native to the site, the ear horns are used to amplify ambient sounds of their environment, often presented along with Carl's field recordings and ecoacoustic compositions. In 2010, Carl and McCoy collaborated on Talking Trees, a site-based interactive sculpture for the Spencer Museum of Art at the University of Kansas.

Her work is in the Oppenheimer Collection at the Nerman Museum of Contemporary Art.

References

External links
 Karen McCoy page at the Smithsonian Center for Folklife and Cultural Heritage
 Interview with Karen McCoy, Institute of Contemporary Art and Cultural Exchange, Tokyo, Japan
 "Talking Trees" by Karen McCoy and Robert Carl (Spencer Museum of Art at the University of Kansas, 2010)
 "Sound of the Sea/Silent Sea" by Karen McCoy and Robert Carl (Sculpture Key West, 2010)
 "Paper Listening Trumpet" on blog for Footwork, A Research Group Attached to the Walking Artists Network, August 2014

American artists
Living people
Year of birth missing (living people)